Parse normally refers to parsing, the process of analyzing text.

Parse or parser may also refer to:
Pârse or Pârsa, the Persian word for Persepolis
Scott Parse (born 1984), an American professional ice hockey player
Parsé Semiconductor Co., an Iranian company
Parse (platform), a mobile software development backend originally created by a cloud services company of the same name
Parser (programming language), a programming language for scripts run on a web server

See also
Parsee